Mujeres asesinas (Killer Women)  is a Mexican drama and psychological thriller television series produced by Pedro Torres. The series is an adaptation of the Argentine series of the same name, produced by Pol-ka from 2005 to 2008.

Plot 

Mujeres Asesinas is a series that shows the dark side of women who have been mistreated or abused and become cruel murderers. The series shows how violence and death can overcome the feminine mind.

Each episode shows a different story of a woman who has committed homicide. These women are motivated by multiple passions such as love, hatred, resentment, vengeance, lunacy, despair, fear, anger, addiction, salvation and redemption. Doctor Sofía Capellan and her team of experts try to solve the murders perpetrated by the women.

DIEM 

In the series the Departamento de Investigacion Especializado en Mujeres (Department of Investigation Specializing in Women), is an agency which is in charge of helping women. This agency confronts and resolves brutal crimes in which women are also victims. The Department of Investigation Specializing in Women (DIEM) is an original addition to this version (the Mexican version) as it was not present in the Argentinian version.

First Season

Rosa Maria Bianchi as Doctor Sofia Capellan
Renato Bartilotti as Lieut. Humberto Camacho
Laisha Wilkins as Lieut. Lucia Alvarez

The first season began on June 17, 2008, with the episode "Sonia, Desalmada", starring Leticia Calderón and ended on July 23, 2008, with the episode "Emma, Costurera", starring Verónica Castro. The slogan for the first season was "No Permitas Que Tu Mujer Vea Esta Nueva Serie" ("Don't let your wife watch this new series").

Second Season

Season two began on July 14, 2009, with the episode of "Clara, Fantasiosa", starring Edith González and ended on August 25 with the episode "Carmen, Honrada", starring Carmen Salinas. The theme song for the second season was "Que Emane" sung by Gloria Trevi.

The second season's slogan was "Mueres Por Que Tu Mujer La Vea" ("you'll be dying to let your wife watch it").

Third Season

The third season began on September 21, 2010, with the episode of "Irma, de los Peces", starring Jaqueline Bracamontes and ended with "Las Cotuchas, Empresarias" starring María Rojo, Pilar Pellicer and Patricia Reyes Spíndola. In the U.S. the series premiered on January 13, 2011, on Univision with the episode "Luz, Arrolladora"  Cynthia Klitbo, and only aired seven episodes, before it was discontinued for unknown reasons.
Season three had two different theme songs depending on the episode. The first is "Alma Perdida", sung by Ana Bárbara, while the other is "Con Las Manos Atadas", sung by Yuri, though Yuri's song never opened any of the episodes that were aired in the U.S.

The slogan for the third season was " A Veces El Corazón Habla Con Sangre" ("Sometimes The Heart Speaks With Blood"). However, in the United States, it was "Porque La Tercera Vez, Es La Que Duele Más" ("Because the third time is the one that hurts the most").

Series overview

Episodes

Season 1 (2008)

Season 2 (2009)

Season 3 (2010)

References 

Mexican crime television series
Mexican drama television series
2008 Mexican television series debuts
2011 Mexican television series endings
Mexican television series based on Argentine television series